Navpreet Singh Cheema (born 15 June 1979) is an Indian shot putter.
His personal best throw is 19.93 metres, achieved in July 2004 in Chennai.

Competition record

References

1979 births
Living people
Indian male shot putters
Athletes (track and field) at the 2006 Asian Games
Place of birth missing (living people)
Asian Games competitors for India
Athletes (track and field) at the 2002 Commonwealth Games
Commonwealth Games competitors for India